John "Hal" Perry (born 18 November 1965) is a Canadian politician, who was elected to the Legislative Assembly of Prince Edward Island in the 2011 provincial election. He represents the district of Tignish-Palmer Road as a member of the Liberal Party. He was originally elected as a member of the Progressive Conservative Party, but left the Progressive Conservative Party and joined the Liberal Party on October 3, 2013.

He was chosen as Opposition Leader on January 30, 2013, following the resignation of Olive Crane, but resigned from that position on February 11 after losing the race for the interim leadership of the Progressive Conservatives to Steven Myers.

On May 21, 2015, Perry was appointed to the Executive Council of Prince Edward Island as Minister of Education, Early Learning and Culture, following Tina Mundy's resignation from cabinet. He was shuffled out of cabinet in January 2016.

Prior to his election, Perry was employed as a property development officer with the PEI Department of Environment, Energy and Forestry.

Perry is a direct descendant of 19th century Speaker of the PEI Legislature Stanislaus Francis Perry.

Election results

References

External links
 Legislative Assembly of PEI biography

Living people
People from Prince County, Prince Edward Island
Prince Edward Island Liberal Party MLAs
Progressive Conservative Party of Prince Edward Island MLAs
Members of the Executive Council of Prince Edward Island
21st-century Canadian politicians
1965 births